Herbiconiux ginsengi is a Gram-positive, rod-shaped and non-motile bacterium from the genus of Herbiconiux which has been isolated from a ginseng root from Fusong County in China.

References

Microbacteriaceae
Bacteria described in 2007